The OTB Open was a WTA Tour, Grand Prix and ATP Tour affiliated tennis tournament played from 1985 to 1994. It was held in Schenectady, New York and played on outdoor hard courts. It was sponsored by the Capital District Regional Off-Track Betting Corporation.

Results

Men's singles

Women's singles

Men's doubles

Women's doubles

References

External links
 ATP Tour website

 
ATP Tour
Defunct tennis tournaments in the United States
Grand Prix tennis circuit
Hard court tennis tournaments
WTA Tour
1985 establishments in New York (state)